Heatly School is a public Pre K-12 school located in Green Island, Albany County, New York, U.S.A., and is the only high school operated by the Green Island Union Free School District.

The school is named after James Heatly, who was the Superintendent of Schools from 1880 to 1924. Heatly School was renovated in the 1950s and an addition, including a new gymnasium, laboratories, additional classrooms and other renovations were built beginning in 2006.

Footnotes

Schools in Albany County, New York
Public high schools in New York (state)